Cedric Terry Wins is a retired U.S. Army general officer. Major General Wins was the last commander of RDECOM, in the U.S. Army Materiel Command, and the first commanding general (CG) of Combat Capabilities Development Command (DEVCOM), in the combat development element of U.S. Army Futures Command. In all, some 13,000 people work in some Science and Technology (S&T), or (RDT&E— research, development, test, and evaluation) capacity for DEVCOM.

On November 13, 2020, Wins was appointed interim superintendent of Virginia Military Institute. On April 15, 2021, the VMI Board of Visitors voted unanimously to appoint him as the Institute's 15th superintendent, the first African American to hold the position in the Institute’s 181-year old history.

Education

Wins is a 1985 graduate of the Virginia Military Institute with a bachelor's degree in economics, and was commissioned a Field Artillery officer in July 1985. After his Field Artillery Officer Basic and Advanced Courses, Wins continued with the U.S. Army Command and General Staff College.  Wins earned an M.S. in national security and strategic studies from the National War College, and  an M.S. in management from the Florida Institute of Technology.

Assignments
Before his assignment as RDECOM commander, Wins served as Director, Force Development in the Office of the Deputy Chief of Staff, G-8. During his 30 years of service, Wins has held leadership and staff assignments in the 7th Infantry Division (Light), Office of the Deputy Chief of Staff, G-8. Additionally, Wins has been stationed at Fort Ord, California; the 2nd Infantry Division, Eighth United States Army, Korea; Headquarters Department of the Army and the Joint Staff, The Pentagon; the 4th Infantry Division, Fort Hood, Texas; Strategic Planning, J-8, U.S. Special Operations Command, MacDill Air Force Base, Florida; and the Requirement Integration Directorate, Army Capabilities Integration Center, Joint Base Langley-Eustis, Virginia.

His deployments include:
Task Force Sinai, Multinational Force and Observers, Egypt
Operations Officer, Headquarters and Headquarters Battery, 5th Battalion, 21st Infantry (Light)
Program Executive Officer, Joint Program Executive Office – Afghanistan Public Protection Force
Combined Security Transition Command – Afghanistan, Operation Enduring Freedom 
Deputy Commander, Police, North Atlantic Treaty Organization Training Mission – Afghanistan/Combined Security Transition Command – Afghanistan, Operation Enduring Freedom

Wins retired from the Army on 6 November 2019, after 34 years of service.

Awards and decorations
His awards and badges include:
 Distinguished Service Medal
 Defense Superior Service Medal
 Legion of Merit (with One Oak Leaf Cluster)
 Bronze Star Medal
 Defense Meritorious Service Medal 
 Meritorious Service Medal (with One Oak Leaf Cluster)
 Joint Service Commendation Medal 
 Army Commendation Medal (with Two Oak Leaf Clusters) 
 Joint Service Achievement Medal 
 Army Achievement Medal (with One Oak Leaf Cluster)  
 Parachutist Badge 
 Joint Chiefs of Staff Identification Badge
 Army Staff Identification Badge

Virginia Military Institute
He is the most recent superintendent, following the resignation of the previous superintendent, J.H. Binford Peay over pressure from a state investigation into allegations of racism at the VMI.

References

Year of birth missing (living people)
Living people
Virginia Military Institute alumni
Florida Institute of Technology alumni
National War College alumni
United States Army generals
Recipients of the Legion of Merit
Recipients of the Distinguished Service Medal (US Army)
Recipients of the Defense Superior Service Medal